Protomyctophum is a genus of lanternfishes.

Species 
There are currently 16 recognized species in this genus:
 Protomyctophum andriashevi Becker, 1963
 Protomyctophum arcticum (Lütken, 1892) (Arctic telescope)
 Protomyctophum beckeri Wisner, 1971
 Protomyctophum bolini (Fraser-Brunner, 1949)
 Protomyctophum chilense Wisner, 1971
 Protomyctophum choriodon Hulley, 1981
 Protomyctophum crockeri (Bolin, 1939) (California flashlightfish)
 Protomyctophum gemmatum Hulley, 1981
 Protomyctophum kolaevi Prokofiev, 2004
 Protomyctophum luciferum Hulley, 1981
 Protomyctophum mcginnisi Prokofiev, 2005
 Protomyctophum normani (Tåning, 1932) (Norman's lanternfish)
 Protomyctophum parallelum (Lönnberg, 1905) (Parallel lanternfish)
 Protomyctophum subparallelum (Tåning, 1932) (Subparallel lanternfish)
 Protomyctophum tenisoni (Norman, 1930)
 Protomyctophum thompsoni (W. M. Chapman, 1944) (Bigeye lanternfish)

References

Myctophidae
Extant Pliocene first appearances
Marine fish genera
Taxa named by Alec Fraser-Brunner